Andy McCondichie (born 21 August 1977) is a Scottish former professional footballer who played as a goalkeeper..

Career
Born in Glasgow, McCondichie played for Celtic Boys Club, Celtic, Hamilton Academical, Raith Rovers, Albion Rovers, Clydebank, Cumnock Juniors, Maryhill, Stranraer and Glenafton Athletic

McCondichie appeared once during his spell at Celtic; his sole appearance coming in a league game in November 1998 against Dundee after injuries to Jonathan Gould and Stewart Kerr, and before Celtic were able to sign Tony Warner on loan as cover.

References

1977 births
Living people
Scottish footballers
Celtic F.C. players
Hamilton Academical F.C. players
Raith Rovers F.C. players
Albion Rovers F.C. players
Clydebank F.C. (1965) players
Cumnock Juniors F.C. players
Maryhill F.C. players
Stranraer F.C. players
Glenafton Athletic F.C. players
Scottish Football League players
Association football goalkeepers
Scottish Junior Football Association players
Footballers from Glasgow